Portage County Airport , also known as Portage County Regional Airport, is a public use airport in Portage County, Ohio, United States. It is owned by the Portage County Airport Authority and located three nautical miles (6 km) north of Ravenna, in Shalersville Township. This airport is included in the National Plan of Integrated Airport Systems for 2011–2015, which categorized it as a general aviation facility.

This airport is assigned a three-letter location identifier of POV by the Federal Aviation Administration, but it does not have an International Air Transport Association (IATA) airport code (the IATA assigned POV to Prešov Airport in Slovakia). The airport's former FAA identifier was 29G.

Facilities and aircraft 
Portage County Airport covers an area of 76 acres (31 ha) at an elevation of 1,198 feet (365 m) above mean sea level. It has one runway designated 9/27 with an asphalt surface measuring 3,499 by 75 feet (1,066 x 23 m).

For the 12-month period ending June 21, 2010, the airport had 9,621 aircraft operations, an average of 26 per day: 84% general aviation, 14% air taxi, and 2% military. At that time there were 62 aircraft based at this airport: 82% single-engine, 8% multi-engine, 8% ultralight, and 2% helicopter.

References

External links 
 Portage County Airport website
 Aerial image as of September 2000 from USGS The National Map
 

Airports in Ohio
Transportation in Portage County, Ohio
Buildings and structures in Portage County, Ohio